The Netherlands Philharmonic Orchestra (NedPhO) is a Dutch symphony orchestra based in Amsterdam.

History
The NedPhO was formed in 1985 from the merger of three orchestras: the Amsterdam Philharmonic Orchestra, the Utrecht Symphony Orchestra Utrecht and the Netherlands Chamber Orchestra. The Netherlands Chamber Orchestra (NKO) continues to give concerts under its own name, with both it and the NedPhO as part of the Netherlands Philharmonic Orchestra Foundation, which is headquartered in Amsterdam. The NedPhO Foundation comprises the largest orchestra organisation in the Netherlands, with 130 musicians on staff.

Since 2012, both the NedPhO and the NKO rehearse at the NedPho Koepel, a former church converted into a dedicated rehearsal space in eastern Amsterdam. The NedPhO gives concerts in Amsterdam at the Concertgebouw. In addition, the NedPhO currently serves as the principal orchestra for productions at Dutch National Opera (DNO). The NedPhO had given a concert series at the Beurs van Berlage until 2002, when budget cuts led to the end of that series. Since 2005-06, the NedPhO also gives a series of concerts at the Muziekcentrum Vredenburg in Utrecht.

The chief conductor of the NedPhO also serves as chief conductor of the NKO. Hartmut Haenchen was the first chief conductor of the NedPhO, from 1985 to 2002. He continues to work with the orchestra as a guest conductor. Yakov Kreizberg succeeded Haenchen as chief conductor of the NedPhO and the NKO in 2003, holding both posts until his death in March 2011, the year that he had been scheduled to step down from both posts. In March 2009, the NedPhO announced the appointment of Marc Albrecht as the orchestra's third chief conductor, effective with the 2011-2012 season, for an initial contract of 4 years. With Albrecht's parallel appointment as chief conductor of DNO, this arrangement allows for the NedPhO to serve as the principal opera orchestra for DNO.  In May 2016, the NedPhO announced the extension of Albrecht's contract through the 2019-2020 season.  Albrecht concluded his chief conductorships of the NedPhO and the NKO at the close of the 2019-2020 season.

In February 2018, Lorenzo Viotti first guest-conducted the NedPhO.  In April 2019, the NedPhO announced the appointment of Viotti as its next chief conductor, effective with the 2020-2021 season.

The Netherlands Philharmonic Orchestra has made a number of recordings for Pentatone, ICA Classics, Tacet, Brilliant Classics and others.

Chief Conductors
 Hartmut Haenchen (1985–2002)
 Yakov Kreizberg (2003–2011)
 Marc Albrecht (2011–2020)
 Lorenzo Viotti (2021-present)

Selected discography
 Gustav Mahler - Symphony No. 5; Hartmut Haenchen, conductor. PENTATONE PTC 5186004 (2002).
 Antonín Dvořák - New World Symphony & Tchaikovsky - "Romeo and Juliet" Overture; Yakov Kreizberg, conductor. PENTATONE PTC 5186019 (2003).
 Franz Schmidt - Symphony No. 4 & Orchestral music from Notre Dame; Yakov Kreizberg, conductor. PENTATONE PTC 5186015 (2003).
 Richard Wagner - Preludes & Overtures; Yakov Kreizberg, conductor. PENTATONE PTC 5186041 (2004).
 Johannes Brahms - Violin Concerto & Double Concerto for Violin and Cello. Julia Fischer, Daniel Müller-Schott; Yakov Kreizberg, conductor. PENTATONE PTC 5186066 (2007).
 Antonín Dvořák - Symphony No. 8; Holoubek, Op. 110; Polednice, Op. 108. Yakov Kreizberg, conductor. PENTATONE PTC 5186065 (2007).
 Tour de France musicale. - Works by Maurice Ravel, Gabriel Fauré, Claude Debussy; Yakov Kreizberg, conductor. PENTATONE PTC 5186058 (2005).
 Richard Wagner - Preludes & Overtures; Yakov Kreizberg, conductor. PENTATONE PTC 5186041 (2004).
 In Memoriam Yakov Kreizberg. Works by Antonín Dvořák, Claude Debussy, Richard Wagner, Franz Schmidt, Johann Strauss Jr.; Julia Fischer, Yakov Kreizberg, conductor; Wiener Symphoniker, Russian National Orchestra. PENTATONE PTC 5186461 (2012).
 Gustav Mahler - Das Lied von der Erde. Alice Coote, Burkhard Fritz; Marc Albrecht, conductor. PENTATONE PTC 5186502 (2013).
 Mahler Song Cycles. Alice Coote; Marc Albrecht, conductor. PENTATONE PTC 5186576 (2017).
 Johannes Brahms - Piano Quartet Op. 25 (arr. Schönberg) & Arnold Schönberg - Begleitmusik zu einer Lichtspielszene. Marc Albrecht, conductor. PENTATONE PTC 5186398 (2015).
 Gustav Mahler - Symphony No. 4. Elizabeth Watts; Marc Albrecht, conductor. PENTATONE PTC 5186487 (2015).
Richard Strauss - Burleske / Ein Heldenleben. Denis Kozhukhin; Marc Albrecht, conductor. PENTATONE PTC 5186617 (2018).
Zemlinsky - Die Seejungfrau. Marc Albrecht, Netherlands Philharmonic Orchestra. PENTATONE PTC 5186740 (2020).

References

External links
 Official website of the Netherlands Philharmonic Orchestra and the Netherlands Chamber Orchestra

Dutch orchestras
Musical groups established in 1985
1985 establishments in the Netherlands